The Grid, hosted by podcasting and public radio host Jesse Thorn, is an American fifteen-minute weekly rundown of what is trending in indie culture. Each week on IFC, The Grid recommends movies, music, games, and gadgets of interest. Joining Jesse are an array of up-and-coming comedians, offering their own opinions on what is trending now. The Grid aired every Thursday at 7:45 p.m. EST, 4:45 PST on IFC. Various segments from the week's episode can be viewed online at IFC.com and on social networking websites.

Production
The Grid premiered on IFC on September 9, 2010  The program's executive producer is Michael B. Pressman, and the producer is Michelle Von Wald. Each episode is written by Joshua Weiner.

Although Jesse Thorn is the only correspondent to appear on every episode, he did not become the host until episode 104. The first two episodes were hosted by Alex Berg, and the third was hosted by correspondent Sarah Lane. Other correspondents included Alonso Duralde, Whitney Pastorek, Kat Lyn, Ryan Downey, Taylor Orci and Shira Lazar. The director of these episodes was Lew Abramson.

Beginning with episode 111, Michael B. Pressman took over as the show's director and the show's regular correspondents became those listed below.

Correspondents
 Jesse Thorn runs MaximumFun.org, home of the nationally syndicated The Sound Of Young America radio show and podcast. As part of his show, Jesse interviews a new comedian, musician, or filmmaker each week. His previous guests have included Amy Sedaris, Judd Apatow and Fred Armisen. Jesse also co-hosts the podcast Jordan, Jesse, Go! With long-time sidekick and fellow Grid contributor Jordan Morris. In addition to his radio shows, Jesse hosts the video podcast Put This On, a guide to dressing like a grownup in the world of men's fashion. 
 Marisa Pinson, is co-author of Dealbreaker: The Definitive List of Dating Offenses, and is an active member of the Upright Citizens Brigade Theatre in Los Angeles. 
 Jordan Morris, is The Grid’s resident man on the street attending everything from Food Truck Battles to Anime Burlesque Shows.
 Kulap Vilaysack has appeared on NBC’s The Office, and covers comic books, kitschy DVD releases and exciting new gadgets.
 Vince Mancini, editor in chief of popular movie blog FilmDrunk.com, covers DVD and film releases.

Crew
 Executive Producer: Michael B. Pressman
 Producer: Michelle Von Wald
 Supervising Producer: Curtis Gwinn
 Staff Writers: Joshua Weiner, Alex Berg
 Editors: Carlos Pena, Joey Rabier, Brady Hammes, Matt Silfen, Jason Haberman, Cameron Gibson.
 Sound: Aaron D. Murphy, Ilana Urbach, Thomas Curley
 Production Manager: Rachel Garza
 Director of Photography: Jared Varava, Andrew Bridgewater, Dave Chung
 Make-Up: Michal Braun, Natalia Senina
 Stylist: Lauren Shapiro, Amber Sellers
 Production Assistants: Zachary Bradshaw, Cameron Gibson
 Executive Producer for IFC: Douglas Marshall
 Director, Production for IFC: Sara Morrow
 Production Supervisor for IFC: Keisha Punter
 Operations Manager for IFC: Ted Leuci
 Executive Producers: Debbie DeMontreux, Jennifer Caserta, Christine Lubrano

References

External links
 

2010 American television series debuts
IFC (American TV channel) original programming